Elton Gillett Brown (born May 22, 1982) is an American former professional football player who was a guard in the National Football League (NFL) for four seasons. He played college football for the University of Virginia, and was recognized as an All-American. The Arizona Cardinals chose him in the fourth round of the 2005 NFL Draft, and he also played for the New York Sentinels of the United Football League (UFL).  He currently is the Assistant Head Coach and Offensive Coordinator for The Apprentice School in Newport News, VA.

Early years
Brown was born in Hampton, Virginia. He has a brother named Scorpio Brown who played Wide Receiver for the Baltimore Mariners, Richmond Raiders, and Harrisburg Stampede. He attended Hampton High School, where he was a standout player for the Hampton Crabbers high school football.

College career
Brown accepted an athletic scholarship to attend the University of Virginia, where he played for coach Al Groh's Virginia Cavaliers football team from 2001 to 2004. As a senior in 2004, he was recognized as a first-team All-Atlantic Coast Conference (ACC) selection and a consensus first-team All-American. In recognition of his outstanding college football career, the Virginia athletic department retired his jersey, No. 61, on September 24, 2011.

Professional career
After four seasons with the Cardinals, Brown was cut on September 8, 2009. He had started fourteen of the thirty-four games he played for the Cardinals.

References

External links
Arizona Cardinals bio 
Just Sports Stats

1982 births
Living people
All-American college football players
American football offensive guards
American football offensive tackles
Arizona Cardinals players
Hampton High School (Virginia) alumni
Hartford Colonials players
New York Sentinels players
Players of American football from Virginia
Sportspeople from Hampton, Virginia
Virginia Cavaliers football players